Patrik Bengtsson (born 9 March 1971) is a Swedish former professional footballer who played as a midfielder.

References

1971 births
Living people
Swedish footballers
Association football midfielders
Allsvenskan players
Danish Superliga players
IFK Göteborg players
Västra Frölunda IF players
Falkenbergs FF players
Herfølge Boldklub players
Swedish expatriate footballers
Swedish expatriate sportspeople in Denmark
Expatriate men's footballers in Denmark